Matt Sorteberg (born March 2, 1986) is an American professional ice hockey defenseman who is currently playing for the Utah Grizzlies in the ECHL.

Sorteberg attended Quinnipiac University, where he played college hockey with the Quinnipiac Bobcats men's ice hockey team before turning professional with the Idaho Steelheads at the end of the 2008–09 ECHL season.

Awards and honors

References

External links

1986 births
Living people
American men's ice hockey defensemen
Idaho Steelheads (ECHL) players
Quinnipiac Bobcats men's ice hockey players
Utah Grizzlies (AHL) players
Ice hockey players from Minnesota
People from Anoka, Minnesota